In the context of data visualization, a glyph is any marker, such as an arrow or similar marking, used to specify part of a visualization. This is a representation to visualize data where the data set is presented as a collection of visual objects. These visual objects are collectively called a glyph. It helps visualizing data relation in data analysis, statistics, etc. by using any custom notation.

Constructing glyphs
Glyph construction can be a complex process when there are many dimensions to be represented in the visualization. Maguire et al proposed a taxonomy based approach to glyph-design that uses a tree to guide the visual encodings used to representation various data items.

Duffy et al created perhaps one of the most complex glyph representations with their representation of sperm movement.

References

Further reading

External links
Visualize Free - Data Visualization Software & Visual Analytics Application
Data Science - Learn, Grow, Build Connections & Transform The World With AI

Infographics
Data visualization
Computer graphics